The 1948 Marquette Hilltoppers football team was an American football team that represented Marquette University as an independent during the 1949 college football season. In its 19th and final season under head coach Frank Murray, the team compiled a 4–5 record and outscored all opponents by a total of 257 to 209. The team played its home games at Marquette Stadium in Milwaukee.

Schedule

References

Marquette
Marquette Golden Avalanche football seasons
Marquette Hilltoppers football